Sunmarke is a British Curriculum and IB World School in Dubai offering a Nursery and EYFS to Year 13 programme of study. It is owned by the Fortes Education Group.

This international school follows the British curriculum, with Year 11 students undertaking GCSE and additional vocational BTEC examinations. In Year 12 and 13, students are given the choice of either the  International Baccalaureate Curriculum, with Diploma Programmes and Career-related Programmes, or the British Curriculum with A levels and BTECs.

Campus 
On its 40,000 square metre campus, Sunmarke School has a 400 seat Auditorium for various Performing Arts including football fields, basketball, volleyball, and netball courts, swimming pools, technology labs, art, music, and dance studios, three libraries, and a Zen garden.

KHDA Inspection Report 
The Knowledge and Human Development Authority (KHDA), an educational quality assurance authority based in Dubai, rated the school "Very Good" for 2019-20 and 2018-19. Below is a summary of the inspection ratings for Sunmarke School.

References

External links
 Official website

British international schools in Dubai
Education companies of the United Arab Emirates
Educational institutions established in 1975